The 1987 FINA Men's Water Polo World Cup was the fifth edition of the event, organised by the world's governing body in aquatics, the International Swimming Federation (FINA). The event took place in Thessalonica, Greece. Eight teams participated to decide the winner of what would be a bi-annual event until 1999.

Final ranking

References

1987
F
W
1987
Sports competitions in Thessaloniki